Epicauta haematocephala, is a species of blister beetle found in Sri Lanka.

References 

Meloidae
Insects of Sri Lanka
Insects described in 1880